Byfjorden may refer to several fjords in Scandinavia:

Places

Norway
Byfjorden (Vestland), a fjord in the city of Bergen in Vestland county
Byfjorden (Rogaland), a fjord in the city of Stavanger in Rogaland county
Byfjorden (Agder), a fjord in the city of Kristiansand in Agder county
Byfjorden (Tønsberg), a fjord in the city of Tønsberg in Vestfold og Telemark county

Sweden
Byfjorden (Sweden), a fjord in Bohuslän in Västra Götaland county